The West Long Branch Public Schools is a community public school district that serves students in pre-kindergarten through eighth grade from West Long Branch, in Monmouth County, New Jersey, United States. Students from Interlaken attend the district as part of a sending/receiving relationship in which students attend on a tuition basis, as do students from Loch Arbour, New Jersey, who began attending schools in West Long Branch starting in the 2017-18 school year, after leaving the Ocean Township School District and those from Allenhurst, after a 2017 decision that terminated a relationship with the Asbury Park Public Schools.

As of the 2020–21 school year, the district, comprised of two schools, had an enrollment of 571 students and 65.5 classroom teachers (on an FTE basis), for a student–teacher ratio of 8.7:1.

The district is classified by the New Jersey Department of Education as being in District Factor Group "FG", the fourth-highest of eight groupings. District Factor Groups organize districts statewide to allow comparison by common socioeconomic characteristics of the local districts. From lowest socioeconomic status to highest, the categories are A, B, CD, DE, FG, GH, I and J.

For ninth through twelfth grades, public school students attend Shore Regional High School, a regional high school located in West Long Branch that also serves students from the constituent districts of Monmouth Beach, Oceanport and Sea Bright, together with out-of-district students who pay tuition to attend the school. As of the 2020–21 school year, the high school had an enrollment of 609 students and 54.1 classroom teachers (on an FTE basis), for a student–teacher ratio of 11.3:1.

Schools
Schools in the district (with 2020–21 enrollment data from the National Center for Education Statistics) are:
Betty McElmon Elementary School with 319 students in pre-Kindergarten through fourth grade
James J. Erhardt, Principal
Frank Antonides School with 243 students in fifth through eighth grades
Allyson Winter, Principal

Administration
Core members of the district's administration are:
Dr. Christina Egan, Superintendent
Corey Lowell, Business Administrator / Board Secretary

Board of education
The district's board of education, comprised of nine members, sets policy and oversees the fiscal and educational operation of the district through its administration. As a Type II school district, the board's trustees are elected directly by voters to serve three-year terms of office on a staggered basis, with three seats up for election each year held (since 2012) as part of the November general election. The board appoints a superintendent to oversee the district's day-to-day operations and a business administrator to supervise the business functions of the district.

References

External links
West Long Branch Public Schools

School Data for the West Long Branch Public Schools, National Center for Education Statistics
Shore Regional High School

West Long Branch, New Jersey
New Jersey District Factor Group FG
School districts in Monmouth County, New Jersey